Muskingum University is a private university in New Concord, Ohio. Chartered in 1837 as Muskingum College, the institution is affiliated with the Presbyterian Church (USA).

Collectively, the university's alumni are referred to as the "Long Magenta Line" and students (both past and present) are known simply as "Muskies" while its athletic teams are called the "Fighting Muskies". New Concord is located in far eastern Muskingum County, which derives its name from the Muskingum River. Muskingum offers more than 40 academic majors. Graduate programs are offered in education and management information systems, strategy and technology. Muskingum's campus consists of 21 buildings, a football stadium, and a small lake which all sit atop  of rolling hills overlooking New Concord.

History
In 1827, the National Road (now US 40) was laid through what is now New Concord, roughly following what had been the primitive roadway known as Zane's Trace. A year later, the village of New Concord was established by Scotch-Irish Presbyterians. On July 9, 1836, the first recorded meeting of the "Friends of Education" in New Concord, led by residents Samuel Willson and Benjamin Waddle, was held. A year later, the Ohio General Assembly authorized the creation of a college in New Concord after being petitioned by the "Friends of Education" committee. On April 24, 1837, Muskingum College opened. Muskingum became a coeducational institution in 1854. In 1958, the United Presbyterian Church of North America and the Presbyterian Church in the United States of America merged by signing a historic agreement in Brown Chapel on Muskingum's campus. In 2001, the school's women's softball team captured the NCAA Division III National Championship, the school's first national title.

In 2009, Muskingum College achieved university status to become Muskingum University.

Academics
Muskingum has been continuously accredited by the North Central Association of College and Secondary Schools since 1919. "The school up on the hill", as it is sometimes called by locals, offers Bachelor of Arts and Bachelor of Science degrees at the undergraduate level, and at the graduate level Master of Information Strategy Systems and Technology, Master of Arts in Education, and Master of Arts in Teaching graduate degrees. The university offers 44 academic majors along with a large number of minors, nine pre-professional programs (including pre-law and pre-medicine) and teaching licensure, all of which must be pursued within a strong liberal arts curriculum, known at Muskingum as the "Liberal Arts Essentials" (LAEs) (see below). Among Muskingum's strongest undergraduate academic programs are its science division, math program, education department, and English department. Muskingum is often proclaimed as a "best value" in education, by combining strong academics with low tuition, by U.S. News & World Report and similar publications. In their 2008 America's Best College's guide, U.S. News & World Report ranked Muskingum the "31st Best Master's Level University" in the Midwest academically. and the "4th Best Value" among Midwest Master's Level Universities.

Campus

Most of Muskingum's academic buildings are clustered around a traditional quad near the southern part of the campus. The quad is bordered by Montgomery Hall and the College Library to the south, Caldwell Hall, Cambridge Hall and the Student/Faculty Center to the west, the Recreation Center and John Glenn Gym to the north and Boyd Science Center to the east. Brown Chapel sits on the southeastern corner of the quad.
 Paul Hall (1873) is the oldest building on Muskingum's campus. Two previous versions of this building burnt down early in the school's history. This third structure is named for Dr. David Paul, president of the college from 1865 to 1879. The building, which currently houses the art department, is registered as a National Historic Site.
 Johnson Hall (1899) is named for Dr. Jesse Johnson, Muskingum's president from 1883 to 1902. Renovated in 1977, it contained art studios, the Louis Palmer Gallery and a 160-seat proscenium thrust theater. Johnson Hall was torn down in 2008.
 The Little Theater (1900) was constructed for physical education purposes and remodeled in 1943 for theatrical use, and was used as classroom space primarily in theatre until it was torn down in 2009.
 Brown Chapel (1912) is a multi-purpose building which serves the college as a church, chapel, auditorium and classroom. The chapel was named for J.M. Brown, a benefactor of the college and long-time member of the school's board of trustees.
 Montgomery Hall (1921) is the administrative hub of the campus, containing administrative and faculty offices and classrooms. The building is named for Dr. John Knox Montgomery Sr., president of Muskingum from 1904 until 1931, and the unofficial "Father of Muskingum College".
 Cambridge Hall (1929) was built largely with funds contributed by citizens of nearby Cambridge, Ohio. Along with classrooms, the business, English, political science, psychology, sociology, history departments.
 John Glenn Gym (1935) was named in 1962 in honor of the distinguished astronaut-senator graduate. It houses two gymnasiums, a swimming pool, recreation and intramural equipment and coaches' offices.
 The Student/Faculty Center (1960) includes the campus center, snack bar, mailroom, bookstore, and meeting rooms. It also houses the Student Life Office, the Office of Career Services, Internships and Leadership Development, Student Senate, Student Activities, Counseling and Special Events.
 Boyd Science Center (1971) is a four-floor building housing the biology, chemistry, geology, mathematics, modern languages, computer science and physics departments.
 Anne C. Steele Center (1986) is a four-story building named for Dr. Anne C. Steele, Muskingum's 20th president, and first female president.  Muskingum's Opening Convocation and Commencement are held each year in the center.  It houses a 2,800-seat gym, dance rooms, racquetball courts, weight room, athletic training room and locker rooms.  It also houses the physical education department and the athletic department. 
This 21st century instructional space features multi-media classrooms, computer-aided design laboratory, lecture hall, seminar rooms, exhibit hall, radio and television studios, a 250-seat theatre, recital hall and cinema, costume & set design laboratories, tech support areas and an experimental theatre/rehearsal hall.
The innovative design of this new building also "bridges" the east and west hills of the campus.
 The Neptune Center (2008) This building is home for the Art Department's program in ceramics, sculpture, and other three-dimensional creative work.
 Walter Hall (2010) - Dedicated in April 2011. It became the new home for the music program, world languages and the Center for the Advancement of Learning (PLUS program).
 Roberta A. Smith Library (2016) This new facility houses the new library as well as the Teacher Preparation Program.
 Louis O. Palmer Gallery (2013) The Palmer Gallery is a teaching gallery designed to showcase the work of Muskingum students, faculty, alumni, and guest artists.  It features a central gallery, auxiliary spaces to support events, and environmentally-friendly solar panels to help support its electricity consumption.

Fraternities and sororities
More than one in every four undergraduate students at Muskingum are members of fraternities or sororities. The university has seven active fraternities on campus: Phi Kappa Tau, Phi Kappa Psi, Kappa Sigma, Phi Mu Alpha Sinfonia, Ulster (local), and M.A.C.E. (local). Phi Kappa Tau and Kappa Sigma started as local organizations (Alban and Sphinx respectively) while other national organizations came on as colonies. The university also has five sororities: Chi Alpha Nu (local), FAD (local), Delta Gamma Theta (local), and Theta Phi Alpha.

Athletics
Muskingum competes athletically in the NCAA as a Division III school and as one of the first and longest affiliated members of the Ohio Athletic Conference (OAC). M.U.'s teams compete under the name the Fighting Muskies. Its mascot is the Fighting Muskie (muskellunge), the largest member of the pike family.

Rather than using the traditional magenta, Muskies athletics wear black and red. The school's main athletic rival is fellow OAC competitor the Marietta College Pioneers (which ironically was originally called the Muskingum Academy when established in 1797). Muskingum fields teams in American football, men's and women's basketball, women's volleyball, baseball, women's softball, wrestling and men's and women's indoor track, outdoor track, soccer, tennis, cross country, lacrosse, and golf.
Muskingum has won 79 Ohio Athletic Conference (OAC) Championships, since the school joined the conference in 1923.

In the 41 seasons between 1926 and 1966, Muskingum won 12 OAC football championships, ten outright, and two shared. Six of those championships were won from 1945 to 1966 when the team was led by College Football Hall of Fame member Ed Sherman, a former Muskingum quarterback. In Sherman's last three seasons, the Muskies represented the OAC in the Grantland Rice Bowl in 1964 and 1966.

Notable alumni

Collectively, Muskingum's alumni are referred to as the "Long Magenta Line".

Former astronaut and U.S. senator John Glenn grew up in New Concord and graduated with a Bachelor of Science degree in Engineering from Muskingum in 1943. He was awarded an honorary degree from Muskingum in 1961, and announced his retirement from the United States Senate in Brown Chapel live on national television in 1997. Upon his retirement, Glenn donated his archives to the Ohio State University, with special conditions that Muskingum students could benefit from the collection at any time.

References

External links

 Official website
 Official athletics website

 
Victorian architecture in Ohio
Private universities and colleges in Ohio
Educational institutions established in 1837
Education in Muskingum County, Ohio
National Register of Historic Places in Muskingum County, Ohio
Buildings and structures in Muskingum County, Ohio
Universities and colleges affiliated with the Presbyterian Church (USA)
Tourist attractions in Muskingum County, Ohio
1837 establishments in Ohio